Lauren Swickard (born May 25, 1993), also known as Lorynn York, is an American actress, writer and producer. She is best known for her role as Callie in A California Christmas and A California Christmas: City Lights.

Early life
Swickard was born in Cincinnati, Ohio. Her mother, Linda Berry York, is a homemaker and her father, Michael York, is a technology entrepreneur. She has one younger sister named Sarah York. At a younger age Swickard attended the School of American Ballet, where she danced professionally.

Career
Swickard began her career by acting in various smaller roles in 2011. In her early career she had appearances in many short films and TV shows. She had one major role in the TV Series Social Path which aired between 2012 and 2014. In 2017 she starred in films such as Web Cam Girls and Struggleing. In 2020, Swickard starred in Roped, Twisted Twin and A California Christmas. Swickard also wrote and produced A California Christmas.

Personal life
Swickard met Josh Swickard while filming Roped, where they both starred. In 2018 they announced their engagement, and in July 2019 they got married. In 2021, the couple welcomed their first child together, a daughter, named Savannah Kaye Swickard. In 2023, they welcomed their second child, a son, named Arthur Swickard.

Filmography

Film

Television

References 

Living people
1993 births
American film actresses
People from Cincinnati